Minuscule 369 (in the Gregory-Aland numbering), ε 429 (Soden), is a Greek minuscule manuscript of the New Testament, on parchment. Paleographically it has been assigned to the 14th century. 
It has marginalia.

Description 

The codex contains the text of the Gospel of Mark 6:25-9:45; 10:17-16:9 on 23 parchment leaves. The text is written in one column per page, in 25 lines per page.

The manuscript contains also a Greek Grammar and Phaedrus fables. 
The text is much rubricated.

It contains also a part of a Greek Grammar and "Avieni Fabulae".

Text 

The Greek text of the codex is a representative of the Byzantine text-type. Aland placed it in Category V.

History 

The manuscript was added to the list of New Testament manuscripts by Scholz (1794-1852). 
It was examined by Burgon. C. R. Gregory saw it in 1886.

The manuscript is currently housed at the Biblioteca Riccardiana (90) in Florence.

See also 

 List of New Testament minuscules
 Biblical manuscript
 Textual criticism

References

Further reading 

 

Greek New Testament minuscules
14th-century biblical manuscripts